Knowledge Quarter typically refers to an area of a city that focuses heavily on the education, knowledge and research sectors. It may refer to:

Knowledge Quarter, Liverpool
Knowledge Quarter, London